The San Diego Jewish World is a publication that covers Jewish-interest news and cultural affairs in the San Diego, California, area  and international Jewish news.

The World was founded in 2009 by Donald and Nancy Harrison and was published by The Harrison Enterprises.  It has correspondents throughout the United States, Israel, and in countries with large Jewish populations.  The World staff is composed of volunteers many from the former San Diego Jewish Press-Heritage and the San Diego Jewish Times.

Its main competitor is the San Diego Jewish Journal. In November 2021, Jacob Kamaras bought the publication and began to serve as its editor and publisher.

References

Jewish magazines published in the United States
Jews and Judaism in San Diego
Mass media in San Diego
Magazines published in California
Magazines established in 2009
Local interest magazines published in the United States